Michael John Streit (born 1950) is former justice of the Iowa Supreme Court.

Education 
Streit was born and raised in Sheldon, Iowa. He received his bachelor's degree in economics from the University of Iowa in 1972, and his Juris Doctor degree from the University of San Diego School of Law in 1975. In law school, he was the editor in chief of the San Diego Law Review.

Legal and judicial career 
After graduating from law school, Streit practiced law at Moore & Shelton in Chariton, Iowa until 1983. In that time, Streit also served as the Lucas County attorney. 1983, Streit was appointed to the Iowa District Court by Terry Branstad. Branstad then appointed Streit to the Iowa Court of Appeals in 1986. In 2001, Tom Vilsack appointed Streit to the Iowa Supreme Court. In 1992, Streit founded the Iowa Judicial Institute.

In 2010, Streit lost a retention vote along with David L. Baker and Marsha Ternus after a campaign against the Iowa Supreme Court's decision in Varnum v. Brien, which struck down a statutory same-sex marriage ban as unconstitutional. In 2012, Streit received a Profile in Courage Award from the John F. Kennedy Library Foundation. He has also received the Distinguished Alumni Award from the University of San Diego and served on the Board of Counselors of Drake University Law School.

After leaving the bench, Streit practiced law at Ahlers & Cooney in Des Moines, Iowa from 2011 to 2018, then at Sullivan & Ward P.C. in West Des Moines from 2018 to the present. He practices mediation, arbitration, and litigation.

Justice Streit is married and has one son.

References

Living people
Iowa state court judges
Justices of the Iowa Supreme Court
University of San Diego School of Law alumni
University of Iowa alumni
People from Sheldon, Iowa
1950 births
People from Johnston, Iowa
People from Chariton, Iowa